Mount Finlayson is a  mountain located on the border of Highlands and Langford, British Columbia, about 14 km northwest of Victoria.  It is located within the Gowlland Range (part of the Vancouver Island Ranges).  It is bordered by Goldstream Provincial Park and Gowlland Tod Provincial Park and forms an imposing feature looming above Saanich Inlet for those travelling south on the Malahat Drive portion of Highway 1.  A steep trail leading up to the summit is easily accessible from Goldstream Park.  There are also trails that link up to the summit from Bear Mountain.

From the top of the mountain there are views of the Greater Victoria area, Strait of Juan de Fuca, Olympic Mountain range and Mount Baker.

References

External links

 Photos of and from the mountain

Mountains of British Columbia under 1000 metres
Vancouver Island Ranges